Konrad Wirnhier (7 July 1937 – 2 June 2002) was a German sport shooter and Olympic champion. He won a gold medal in skeet shooting at the 1972 Summer Olympics in Munich.

References

External links 
 

1937 births
2002 deaths
German male sport shooters
Skeet shooters
Olympic shooters of West Germany
Olympic gold medalists for West Germany
Olympic bronze medalists for West Germany
Shooters at the 1968 Summer Olympics
Shooters at the 1972 Summer Olympics
Olympic medalists in shooting
Medalists at the 1968 Summer Olympics
Medalists at the 1972 Summer Olympics
20th-century German people